Для Тех, Кто Прогулялся Бы С Богами, which translates as For Those Who Would Walk with the Gods, is a special 2001 The Tear Garden compilation created by Brudenia for the Russian market. It contains songs from The Tear Garden's first three LPs (Tired Eyes Slowly Burning, The Last Man to Fly, and To Be an Angel Blind, the Crippled Soul Divide) and second EP (Sheila Liked the Rodeo).

It is unique in that every letter of text on the album, from title to words on the disc itself, are written in Cyrillic lettering. Other special things about this release are noted below.

Track listing
Circles in the Sand – 3:28
In Search of My Rose – 4:28
Sheila Liked the Rodeo – 4:45
Ascension Day – 6:01
White Coats and Haloes – 2:19
Isis Veiled – 3:25
You and Me and Rainbows – 16:49
A Ship Named "Despair" – 3:43
The Running Man – 8:25
Malice Through the Looking Glass – 7:59
Good Evening Houston – 7:02
Good Night Little Lights – 4:55

Notes
Limited to 2000 copies.

Tracks 11 and 12 are unique to this release and cannot be found anywhere else.

Tracks 1, 5, 6, 8 and 9 are originally from the LP The Last Man to Fly.

Tracks 2, 4 and 10 are originally from the LP To Be an Angel Blind, the Crippled Soul Divide.

Track 3 is originally from the EP Sheila Liked the Rodeo.

Track 7 is originally from the LP Tired Eyes Slowly Burning.

2001 compilation albums
The Tear Garden albums